Sérgio Schuler (born 8 November 1972) is a Brazilian alpine skier. He competed in three events at the 1992 Winter Olympics.

References

1972 births
Living people
Brazilian male alpine skiers
Olympic alpine skiers of Brazil
Alpine skiers at the 1992 Winter Olympics
Place of birth missing (living people)